Yusuf Arakkal (1945 – 4 October 2016) was a Malayali painter.

Life

Arakkal was born in Chavakkad, Kerala. Both his parents died when he was young. Leaving the comforts of his house behind, he left for Bangalore, lonely but with a passion to become a painter. The hardships that he faced at Bangalore honed the artist in him and sharpened his sensibility. He took a diploma in painting from Karnataka Chitrakala Parishat (KCP), Bangalore and later specialized in graphic print making from National Academy community studios, Garhi, Delhi.

Arakkal  received the prestigious Lorenzo De Medici Gold Medal, at Florence Internazionale Biennale, in Florence, Italy for his work Bacon’s Man with the Child and Priest. The artist produced a large collection of miscellaneous works consisting of drawings, paintings, sculptures, murals, paper works, prints and writing. 

He won several other awards including Karnataka Lalithkala Academy award in 1979 and 1981, a national award in 1983, a special award at the third Asian Art Biennale Dhaka, Bangladesh in 1986 and the Karnataka Lalithkala Academy honor in 1989.

Arakkal's paintings are singularly expressionistic in style. In them one could trace the artist's "deep concern for man and society. Set against a dark, oppressive background are the faceless figures of ordinary people expressing brooding loneliness and despair brought on by a society obsessively drawn towards material success where ordinary people have no place". He has done many works in different media, canvases, sculptures with emphasis on tiger conservation.

Arakkal died in Bangalore on 4 October 2016 at the age of 71

Exhibitions

He has conducted many exhibitions, both solo and group shows, internationally besides more than thirty national shows. His international shows are listed below.

Solo international shows
1992 -	Relays De Monts - Siux, Limousin, France.
1993 -	Gallerie Taormina Del Arte - Le Havre, France.
1994 -	Srijana Contemporary Art Gallery - Kathmandu, Nepal.
1994 -	Art Forum Gallery, Singapore.
1996 -	Wallace Gallery, Chelsea, New York.
1996 -	Air Gallery, Dower Street, London.

Group International shows
1971 -	Indian Artists at Belarus and Moscow.
1985 -	Thirty contemporary Indian Artists at Habana, Cuba.
1985 -	Contemporary Indian Art show at the National Museum Mexico City, Mexico.
1985 -	Second Asian Art show, Fukuoka, Japan.
1985 -	Indian Printmaking, Festival of India, USA.
1986 -	Sixth biennale de beau Art, Beaumont, France.
1986 -	Third Asian Art Biennale, Dhaka, Bangladesh.
1986 -	Inaugural exhibition of the National Museum of Modern Art, Seoul, South Korea.
1986 -	Sixth International Triennale, New Delhi, India.
1987 -	Ninth International Biennale de São Paulo, Brazil.
1993 -	Nine Indian Artists CCA Gallery, New York.
1994 -	Indian printmaking show, Maltwood Art Museum & Gallery Victoria, British Columbia.
1994 -	Indian Contemporary Art Show, Gallery Maya, Hong Kong
1995 -	Heads and faces - an exhibition by Gallery Maya, Visual Art Centre, Hong Kong.
1995 -	'Save the children' auction by Sothebys, Bombay.
1996 -	Indian Contemporary Art show, Nagai Garo, Tokyo, Japan
1996 -	32 Contemporary Indian artists - exhibition and auction by Christies, London.
1996 -	Women in Indian Art, by The Gallery, Visual Art Centre, Hong Kong.
1997 -	Auction of Indian Contemporary Art by Christies, London.

References

8.

9.

External links
"Yusuf Arakkal Profile,Interview and Artworks"
Yusuf Arakkal's official site

1945 births
2016 deaths
Malayali people
Painters from Kerala
Artists from Bangalore
People from Kozhikode district